Claygate is an affluent suburban village in Surrey, England,  southwest of central London. It is the only civil parish in the borough of Elmbridge. Surrounded by green belt, it lies inside the Greater London Built-up Area.

Claygate was once in the main manor of Thames Ditton, but is now administered from Esher. It is primarily residential and has a small number of offices, outlying farms and two small shopping areas, the Old Village and the Parade, with hair and beauty shops, a supermarket, five pubs and a number of restaurants.

These beds are the youngest part of the London Clay geological formation, forming a transition between the clay and the sandier Bagshot Beds above.

History

Etymology
Claygate may have its name from the clay pits in the village that provided bricks for a large surrounding area including some of Hampton Court Palace.  Claygate's lack of main thoroughfares has been attributed to angle of the River Thames leading the A307 main road (from London) south-west instead through Esher, as well as historical conditions where through roads became impassible in wet weather because of the clay; often close to the surface.  Equally, mid-distance routes chose a line to avoid this land, before the advent of road surfacing, such as those through Tolworth and Esher.

Manor
Claygate appears in Domesday Book as a manor of Thames Ditton, Claigate. This main manor of the village was held by Westminster Abbey. Its domesday assets were:  hide; 2 ploughs,  of meadow, woodland worth 1 hog. It rendered £2 10s 0d per year to its overlords. The manor descended (after its purchase in 1565) from the Vincent family to the Evelyn family.  Much land remained in the manor when it was sold between 1718 and 1721 to the Earl of Lovelace, the King family and currently Locke King family who had sold the vast majority of its land by 1970.

Other medieval history
Claygate was formed as an ecclesiastical parish from Thames Ditton in 1841. Scant remains were traced in boundary lines of an early medieval track running from Kingston Hill to the ford of the Mole near to a square entrenchment in Leatherhead almost in Stoke D'Abernon.

19th century
In about 1822 the Claygate Pearmain apple was discovered by John Braddick, growing in a hedge here.  In 1840 its church, Holy Trinity, was built of stone in 14th-century style, with a tower, enlarged in 1860, and restored in 1902. The school was built in 1838 as a Church school, and enlarged in 1849. It was rebuilt by the School Board of Thames Ditton in 1885. Claygate has a Baptist chapel, built in 1861.

Claygate's development chiefly was in the 60 years after the construction of its railway line and station (on the New Guildford Line); the station opened in 1885.

With commanding views over the surrounding countryside is Ruxley Towers, a Neo-Gothic Victorian edifice constructed by Lord Foley who owned a considerable amount of land. On the other side of the village is Telegraph Hill where a semaphore station was built in 1822 to transmit messages between the Admiralty and Portsmouth.

20th century
In 1911 brick and tile production works, rather than retail sites, continued to employ men near the station in the 1910s. In 1911 Claygate was under the same urban council as Thames Ditton.

21st century 
The Al-Hilli family who were killed in the Annecy shootings lived in Claygate.

Geography
Claygate's topsoil rests upon the youngest beds of the London Clay after which the village is named, here capped in places by sand in the southern part of the civil parish. Claygate has its own parish council. Apart from an interweave of streets with Esher, Claygate is surrounded by woodlands and open countryside, including Claygate Common, Princes Covert, Winney Hill, Surbiton Golf Course, Telegraph Hill, Littleworth Common and Arbrook Common. Much of the outlying farmland is used for grazing ponies, two farms are run for cultivation. The Rythe is a major stream running north through Claygate, and as a responsive channel in the clay basins has been implicated in late 20th century flash flooding in small pockets of the village: a major flood alleviation scheme has been completed which commenced in 2002.

Many of Claygate's residents commute to the capital using the train services, see Transport. Claygate is in the relatively small area between the M25 and Kingston-upon-Thames. Constrained by the Green Belt, demand has resulted in Claygate being subject to a level of permitted in-fill and back-garden development.

Commerce and services
"The Parade" is the larger of Claygate's two shopping areas. It starts at Claygate railway station and continues through The Parade itself into Hare Lane.

Claygate has five pubs: one of the annual village traditions is a Boxing Day tour of these by Morris dancers.

Local newspapers covering Claygate include The Surrey Advertiser, The Surrey Comet and The Herald, and two freely distributed newspapers, The Informer and The Guardian.  Claygate is in the editorial area of BBC Surrey, although its proximity to London means all of the capital's radio stations can be heard.

There are several small farms in Claygate; many of the farms are or incorporate horseriding centres.

Community

Claygate (Primary) School was established in Elm Road in 1885, becoming an Infant School which closed shortly after its centenary – The Firs, the Junior School, became the new single site. The original school building was in the late 20th century redeveloped as Claygate's Youth Centre/Community Centre and Capelfield surgery. Rowan Preparatory School is a private independent school consisting of a nursery and primary school for girls.

The Anglican church is "Holy Trinity", built in 1840, which is unusual for having two spires. There is also a First Church of Christ Scientist. Roman Catholicism is served by the Church of the Holy Name in Arbrook Lane, Esher.

Claygate Village Association is a non-political charity founded in 1946, organise some of the key village events; the Christmas lights, The Claygate Music Festival, the Claygate Gardens Trail, Claygate in Bloom and for the first time in 2014, the Claygate Spring Festival. The village is served with medical support by Capelfield Surgery.
Community groups, clubs,  and sports teams. include Claygate Cricket Club and Claygate Royals Football Club.  A major annual event is the Claygate Flower & Village Show which takes place on the Recreation Ground in late July each year. 2013 saw the 100th show, where there were 7,000 visitors.

A monthly magazine covers the borough with one other edition nationally, Living Within.

Education
Claygate is served by a mix of state and independent schools that also serve the areas of Esher and Hinchley Wood, all of which share the KT10 postcode.

State Primary Schools 

 Esher Church School
 Cranmere Primary
 Hinchley Wood Primary
 Claygate Primary

Independent Primary Schools 

 Rowan Preparatory School
 Shrewsbury House Pre-Prep
 Milbourne Lodge

State Secondary Schools 

 Esher College
Esher Church of England High School 
 Hinchley Wood School

Independent Secondary Schools 

 Milbourne Lodge
 Claremont Fan Court

In arts and the media

Filming carried out in Claygate includes:
The Loneliness of the Long Distance Runner (Tony Richardson 1961) starring Tom Courtenay, set at Ruxley Towers (Ruxton Towers in the film) and showing much of the surrounding countryside before the construction of the Esher By-pass.
The BBC TV situation comedy Wyatt's Watchdogs which starred Brian Wilde and Trevor Bannister and was about a Neighbourhood Watch group.
Never the Twain (1981) which used the Greek Vine restaurant (now Averna, an Italian restaurant) frontage on The Green as the shop fronts. The Thames Television sitcom starred Windsor Davies and Donald Sinden as two grumpy antique shop owners.
A sketch for The Two Ronnies
A shampoo commercial
A clip from Men Behaving Badly. (filmed outside The Winning Horse)

Previous residents of Claygate include "Python" Terry Jones, "Rolling Stone" Ronnie Wood, and presenter/actor Michael Aspel. British historian Frances Yates (1899-1980), a longtime resident, is buried in the churchyard at Holy Trinity church. Claygate often has a celebrity to switch on its Christmas lights. These have included Cliff Richard, Gloria Hunniford, Tony Stamp and Roger Valentine from The Bill, Bernie Nolan, Mick Hucknall, Ronnie Wood, Anthea Turner and most recently Bobby Davro

Transport
Rail
From Claygate railway station; the journey to London Waterloo takes, at its fastest, 29 minutes, the station also provides direct access to central Guildford, London Road, Guildford, Surbiton and Wimbledon. Guildford provides a number of other direction routes as does Clapham Junction.

Buses
Claygate is served by London Buses' route K3 to Esher, Surbiton, Kingston and Roehampton Vale, operated by London United.

Roads
The A3 trunk road has its Hinchley Wood and Esher (A309) spur road directly north of Claygate allowing a traffic-lit junction with convenient access to/from London, and second junction by the Scilly Isles Roundabout with access to Hampton Court Bridge for journeys north.

A third A3 junction is almost 2 km along Copsem Lane to the south for journeys towards the south-west and west, Wisley interchange or for journeys east, continuing south along the A245 to the Leatherhead Common junction of the M25.

Demography
The proportion of households in Claygate who owned their home outright was 8.5% above the regional average.  The proportion who owned their home with a loan was 4.0% higher than the regional average; providing overall a lower proportion than average of rented residential property and of social housing relative to the average in Surrey, the district and the national average. As with neighbouring Esher, Claygate has a large number of very large properties (mansions). These are concentrated within the Ruxley Private Estate, on the Esher-Claygate border and in the roads to the south of the railway station.

Politics
Claygate is served by a Parish Council made up of 10 elected representatives. The Parish Council has some responsibilities, acquired from Surrey County and Elmbridge Borough Councils, such as highway, garden sites and tree planting. The parish council is also influential in its responses to planning applications in the area.

Claygate is in the parliamentary constituency of Esher and Walton, which since its inception in 1997 has been a relatively safe seat for the Conservative Party. The local MP since 2010 is the deputy prime minister, Dominic Raab. Local government is administered by Elmbridge Borough Council and Surrey County Council.

At Surrey County Council, one of its 81 councillors represents the area within the Hinchley Wood, Claygate and Oxshott division.

At Elmbridge Borough Council all wards of the borough are deemed appropriate to be represented under the current constitution of councillors by three councillors.

References

10. Your Councillors by Ward Elmbridge Borough Council * Retrieved 2 September 2016
 Malcolm W H Peebles The Claygate Book: a History of a Surrey Village (1983) and Millennium edition (1999)
 Claygate Village Residents Association Claygate Village: Enquire Within (1983)

External links

Claygate Parish Council website
The Claygate Flower & Village Show website
The Claygate Music Festival website
The History of Claygate
Holy Name Church website
Holy Trinity Church website
1st Claygate Scouts – Scouting in Claygate since 1909

Villages in Surrey
Civil parishes in Surrey
Borough of Elmbridge